Platylabus is a genus of parasitoid wasps belonging to the family Ichneumonidae.

The genus has cosmopolitan distribution.

Platylabus species
These 131 species are members of the genus Platylabus.

 Platylabus abbreviatus Heinrich, 1962
 Platylabus alaskae Heinrich, 1962
 Platylabus alboannulatus Uchida, 1932
 Platylabus altaicus Heinrich, 1978
 Platylabus altitudinis Turner, 1919
 Platylabus arcticus Roman, 1924
 Platylabus arizonae Heinrich, 1962
 Platylabus atricornis Pic, 1926
 Platylabus auriculatus Kriechbaumer, 1890
 Platylabus balearicus Hedwig, 1939
 Platylabus basicinctus Heinrich, 1974
 Platylabus baueri Riedel, 2008  (Europe)
 Platylabus berndi Heinrich, 1962
 Platylabus bicinctus Heinrich, 1974
 Platylabus bobadillai Porter, 1986
 Platylabus borealis Holmgren, 1871  (Europe)
 Platylabus breviscutellatus Heinrich, 1974
 Platylabus brilliantus Kusigemati, 1986  (temperate Asia)
 Platylabus cabrerai Berthoumieu, 1903
 Platylabus caeruleus (Cameron, 1901)
 Platylabus calidus Berthoumieu, 1904
 Platylabus captiosus Heinrich, 1974
 Platylabus cariniscutis (Cameron, 1904)
 Platylabus charlottae Heinrich, 1974
 Platylabus chiapus (Cresson, 1874)
 Platylabus clarus (Cresson, 1867)  (North America)
 Platylabus columbiae Heinrich, 1962
 Platylabus concinnus Thomson, 1888  (Europe)
 Platylabus curtorius (Thunberg, 1822)  (Europe)
 Platylabus decipiens Wesmael, 1848  (Europe)
 Platylabus dilleri Heinrich, 1971
 Platylabus divinus Heinrich, 1974
 Platylabus divisatae Heinrich, 1962
 Platylabus dolorosus (Gravenhorst, 1829)  (Europe)
 Platylabus dubitator Habermehl, 1917
 Platylabus duplificans Heinrich, 1962
 Platylabus eros (Cameron, 1885)
 Platylabus erythrocoxa Heinrich, 1962
 Platylabus eurygaster Holmgren, 1871
 Platylabus ferrugineus Cameron, 1903
 Platylabus flavidoclarus Heinrich, 1977
 Platylabus foxleei Heinrich, 1962  (North America)
 Platylabus fugator (Gravenhorst, 1807)  (Europe)
 Platylabus fuscinerva (Cameron, 1901)
 Platylabus gigas Kriechbaumer, 1886  (Europe)
 Platylabus goliath Heinrich, 1974
 Platylabus gracilicornis (Viereck, 1903)
 Platylabus histrio Wesmael, 1855  (Europe)
 Platylabus hyperetis Heinrich, 1962
 Platylabus imitans Heinrich, 1962  (North America)
 Platylabus incabus Davis, 1898
 Platylabus infirmus Heinrich, 1974
 Platylabus intermedius Holmgren, 1871  (Europe)
 Platylabus iridipennis (Gravenhorst, 1829)  (Europe)
 Platylabus judaicus Berthoumieu, 1900
 Platylabus lieftincki Heinrich, 1934
 Platylabus lissosculptus Heinrich, 1962
 Platylabus longicornis (Brischke, 1891)
 Platylabus luteatae Heinrich, 1962  (North America)
 Platylabus massajae Gribodo, 1879
 Platylabus mcclintockae Kittel, 2016
 Platylabus melanocoxa Heinrich, 1962
 Platylabus mesoleucus Heinrich, 1936  (Europe)
 Platylabus metallicus Bradley, 1903
 Platylabus micheneri Heinrich, 1962
 Platylabus minor Riedel, 2008  (Europe)
 Platylabus moestificus Berthoumieu, 1897
 Platylabus monitus (Cresson, 1868)
 Platylabus monotonops Heinrich, 1962
 Platylabus monotonus Heinrich, 1962
 Platylabus montanus Cresson, 1877
 Platylabus muticus Thomson, 1894
 Platylabus neglectus (Fonscolombe, 1847)  (Europe)
 Platylabus nigricornis Uchida, 1926
 Platylabus nigrocyaneus (Gravenhorst, 1829)  (Europe)
 Platylabus obator (Desvignes, 1856)  (Europe)
 Platylabus odiosus Perkins, 1953  (Europe)
 Platylabus oehlkei Heinrich, 1972
 Platylabus okui Uchida, 1956
 Platylabus opaculus Thomson, 1888  (Europe)
 Platylabus opiparus (Cameron, 1885)
 Platylabus ornatus (Provancher, 1875)
 Platylabus pallidens Wesmael, 1853  (Europe)
 Platylabus parvimaculatus (Cameron, 1903)
 Platylabus parvulus Berthoumieu, 1904
 Platylabus pedatorius Fabricius, 1793  (Europe)
 Platylabus perexiguus Heinrich, 1973  (Europe)
 Platylabus permodestus Heinrich, 1962
 Platylabus polymelas Heinrich, 1962
 Platylabus pseudhistrio Heinrich, 1962
 Platylabus pseudogoliath Heinrich, 1974
 Platylabus pseudopumilio Riedel, 2008  (Europe)
 Platylabus pulcher Cushman, 1922
 Platylabus pullus Wesmael, 1853  (Europe)
 Platylabus pumilio Holmgren, 1871  (Europe)
 Platylabus punctifrons Thomson, 1888  (Europe)
 Platylabus rubeus Valemberg, 1976
 Platylabus rubricapensis Provancher, 1882  (North America)
 Platylabus rubristernatus Heinrich, 1962
 Platylabus ruficoxatus Riedel, 2008  (Europe)
 Platylabus rufus Wesmael, 1845  (Europe)
 Platylabus semiopacus Heinrich, 1962
 Platylabus septemcingulatus Heinrich, 1974
 Platylabus serratae Heinrich, 1962
 Platylabus sexmaculatae Heinrich, 1962
 Platylabus shanicus Heinrich, 1974
 Platylabus sphageti Heinrich, 1971
 Platylabus spiraculus Uchida, 1926
 Platylabus stolidus Perkins, 1953
 Platylabus submarginatus Magretti, 1896
 Platylabus subpinguis (Cameron, 1885)
 Platylabus subrubricus Heinrich, 1962
 Platylabus sulci Gregor, 1940
 Platylabus taiwanus Kusigemati, 1986  (temperate Asia)
 Platylabus takeuchii Uchida, 1930  (temperate Asia)
 Platylabus tenuicornis (Cresson, 1868)  (Europe)
 Platylabus tenuiformis Heinrich, 1962
 Platylabus thalhammeri Strobl, 1901
 Platylabus theresae Pic, 1914
 Platylabus tibialis Ashmead, 1901
 Platylabus transversus Bridgman, 1889  (Europe)
 Platylabus tricingulatus (Gravenhorst, 1820)  (Europe)
 Platylabus uranius (Dalman, 1823)  (Europe)
 Platylabus vaferops Heinrich, 1962
 Platylabus vibicariae Kriechbaumer, 1888
 Platylabus vibratorius (Thunberg, 1822)  (Europe)
 Platylabus victorianus Heinrich, 1974
 Platylabus virescens (Cresson, 1874)
 Platylabus volubilis (Gravenhorst, 1829)  (Europe)
 Platylabus wienkeri (Ratzeburg, 1844)  (Europe)
 Platylabus zagoriensis Heinrich, 1930

References

Ichneumonidae
Ichneumonidae genera